Rawimpact Lifestyle Brand (Stylized RAWiMPACT) is an American lifestyle brand founded in 2010 by Andre Ricks.  It includes streetwear apparel, snapback hats, skateboards, backpacks and accessories.

History 
The initial products were a collection snapback hats and crewneck sweatshirts sold in Kalamazoo, Michigan at the brands flagship brick-and-mortar retail store. The grand opening included autograph signing from boxing legend Thomas 'Hitman' Hearns.

Rawimpact was awarded 'New Business' of The Year by the Kalamazoo, Gazette and Western Herald in March 2011.

In April 2012, Rawimpact was recognized by Western Michigan University and the National Pan-Hellenic Council for sponsoring campus-wide festival that had record breaking numbers with student attendance.

In 2013, the second retail location was opened in Sterling Heights, Michigan. The brand expanded to include skateboard, backpacks and accessories to its catalogue.

Rawimpact was recognized by the City of Detroit for being a marquee sponsor  at Detroit's 'Summer-Jamz 16' along with Heineken powered by WGPR Hot 107.5 in June 2013.

Rawimpact was recognized for sponsoring the winner of the State Farm College Slam Dunk Championship televised on ESPN that featured Rawimpact merchandise 2013.

In 2014, the brand expanded and opened its signature basketball gym in Las Vegas, NV where pro-workouts are held.

The signature basketball gym was recognized by KVVU-TV News for its impact in Las Vegas Community 2018.

In 2019 the signature basketball gym hosted Jr. NBA youth girls basketball camp with over 200 girls in attendance.

In 2020, Rawimpact was recognized for donating over 2000 face mask and apparel to the City of Detroit during the COVID-19 pandemic.

References

External links 
 

Companies based in Kalamazoo, Michigan
Clothing companies established in 2010
Clothing companies of the United States